Jetten is a surname. Notable people with the surname include:

Jolanda Jetten (born 1970), Dutch social psychologist and a professor at the University of Queensland
Mike Jetten (born 1962), Dutch professor of Microbiology
Peter Jetten (born 1985), Canadian professional poker player
Rob Jetten (born 1987), Dutch politician